Krasnoluchensky is a rural locality (a settlement) in Serpo-Molotskoye Rural Settlement, Novonikolayevsky District, Volgograd Oblast, Russia. The population was 91 as of 2010. There are 4 streets.

Geography 
Krasnoluchensky is located in steppe, on the Khopyorsko-Buzulukskaya Plain, 25 km southeast of Novonikolayevsky (the district's administrative centre) by road. Kulikovsky is the nearest rural locality.

References 

Rural localities in Novonikolayevsky District